Alsatites  is an extinct genus of cephalopod belonging to the Ammonite subclass. They lived during the Early Jurassic, Hettangian till the Sinemurian and are generally extremely evolute, many whorled. Keel broad and blunt organisms, they also exhibit a primary ribbing which is close and persistent.

References
Notes

Bibliography
 Arkell, et al.,1957. Mesozoic Ammonoidea; Treatise on Invertebrate Paleontology, Part L (Ammonoidea). Geol Soc of America and Univ Kansas Press, Revised 2013, Part L, Michale K. Howarth

External links
Blog post about Hettangian ammonites by Peter Reiter

Early Jurassic ammonites
Jurassic ammonites of North America
Pliensbachian life
Arietitidae
Ammonitida genera